The 1922 Chicago Cubs season was the 51st season of the Chicago Cubs franchise, the 47th in the National League and the 7th at Wrigley Field (then known as "Cubs Park"). The Cubs finished fifth in the National League with a record of 80–74.

On August 25 at Cubs Park, the Cubs and Philadelphia Phillies combined for 49 runs and 51 hits in a 26-23 Cubs victory, a modern-day record for total runs and hits in a major league game. The Cubs scored 10 runs in the second inning and 14 runs in the fourth inning providing the Cubs enough runs to win.

Regular season

Season standings

Record vs. opponents

Roster

Player stats

Batting

Starters by position 
Note: Pos = Position; G = Games played; AB = At bats; H = Hits; Avg. = Batting average; HR = Home runs; RBI = Runs batted in

Other batters 
Note: G = Games played; AB = At bats; H = Hits; Avg. = Batting average; HR = Home runs; RBI = Runs batted in

Pitching

Starting pitchers 
Note: G = Games pitched; IP = Innings pitched; W = Wins; L = Losses; ERA = Earned run average; SO = Strikeouts

Other pitchers 
Note: G = Games pitched; IP = Innings pitched; W = Wins; L = Losses; ERA = Earned run average; SO = Strikeouts

Relief pitchers 
Note: G = Games pitched; W = Wins; L = Losses; SV = Saves; ERA = Earned run average; SO = Strikeouts

Farm system 

 Class AA: Los Angeles Angels (Pacific Coast League; Red Killefer, manager)

External links
1922 Chicago Cubs season at Baseball Reference

Chicago Cubs seasons
Chicago Cubs season
Chicago Cubs